William Shannon may refer to:
 William V. Shannon (1927–1988), American journalist, author and ambassador
 William E. Shannon (1821/22–1850), American politician